Stans may refer to:

 Stans, a village in Austria
 Stans, a city in Switzerland
 The countries, mostly in South Asia and Central Asia, whose names end in the Persian suffix -stan
 Stans, a fanbase to Eminem